Abutilon thurberi, common name Thurber's Indian mallow, is a plant native to Arizona and Sonora. It is an erect or decumbent subshrub less than one meter tall, with yellow flowers up to six millimeters in diameter. It occurs in shaded locations in the mountains.

References

thurberi
Flora of Arizona
Flora of Sonora
Plants described in 1854